The News Hole with Harry Shearer is a 1994 game show that aired on Comedy Central from October 26 to November 19, 1994.  The show won a CableACE award in December 1995.

In the Encyclopedia of TV Game Shows, Schwartz, Ryan, and Wostbrock describe the show as a "spoof [of] news-based quiz shows."

References

External links
 

Comedy Central original programming
1990s American comedy game shows
1994 American television series debuts
1994 American television series endings
Comedy Central game shows